was a castle structure in Kikuchi, Kumamoto, Japan. Kikuchi castle has been designated as being of national significance. Now Kikuchi castle park is on site.

Kikuchi castle was built by Yamato court. Following the defeat of Yamato Japan in the 663 battle of Hakusukinoe by an alliance of Tang China and the Korean kingdom of Silla, Emperor Tenji ordered the construction of defenses against a possible invasion.

The castle was listed as one of the Continued Top 100 Japanese Castles in 2017.

See also
List of Historic Sites of Japan (Kumamoto)
List of foreign-style castles in Japan

References

Castles in Kumamoto Prefecture
Historic Sites of Japan
Former castles in Japan
Ruined castles in Japan